A mouse jiggler is a software used to simulate the movement of a computer mouse. It can also be a mechanical device moving the physical computer mouse. In all cases, it prevents sleep mode or the screensaver from activating. Mouse jigglers are also known as mouse movers.

Implementations
Mechanical mouse jigglers are small devices onto which a user places their computer mouse. They work by using a full rotating platform or rotating disc underneath the mouse. The movement is subtle but enough to move the user's cursor on their screen.

Software driven mouse movers install a program on the user's machine that also moves the mouse cursor across the screen.

Online monitoring of remote workers 
The demand for mouse jigglers is being driven by employers or line managers indirectly monitoring their employees who are remote workers. Communication applications such as Microsoft Outlook, Teams, Skype, as well as Slack show the working status for everyone within a group. The online status displays work in a traffic light system to show others within the team if someone is available, away, offline, or busy. If these applications are used through a desktop computer (instead of a mobile device), and the user doesn't interact with their mouse for a said period of time, the status will display as inactive. In terms of the traffic light system, the available status will change to inactive. This is the mechanism that provides indirect monitoring of employees. Should someone appear to be inactive or away for a lengthy period of time, it could indicate that the individual is not working. This online monitoring of remote employees is causing a trust issue and employees are searching for ways to overcome the monitoring. Mouse jigglers enable users to keep their screen active while undertaking other tasks. This keeps the status set to available instead of showing a user to be inactive or away.

References 

Computing input devices
Business software